Foxhall Stadium is a Stock car and speedway stadium located in Foxhall near Ipswich. The Stadium is run by Spedeworth Motorsports stock car promoters. The stadium opened in 1951 and has been in continuous operation since.

Stock cars
Known as the Foxhall International Raceway the track is a 382 metre tarmac oval. The traditional main events at the Stadium include The National Hot Rod Championship of the World held the first weekend every July and the Gala Night Held the closest Saturday Night to Guy Fawkes Night. At both events a large entry of Stock Cars, Hot Rods and Banger Racers can be expected as well as a capacity crowd of around 10,000.

Speedway
The Stadium is also used by the Ipswich Witches Speedway team, which race on most Thursday nights from March to October starting at 7.30pm. The venue first hosted speedway on 14 May 1951, when Ipswich competed against Yarmouth in a challenge match.

Other uses
More recently the Unlimited Banger World Final has been staged here since its move from the now demolished Plough Lane venue in London. The world final first ran at Foxhall in 2008 and proved to be a successful change. The world final is predicted to stay at Foxhall for the foreseeable future.

Foxhall has also hosted the Superstox World Championship race seven times including the first running back in 1961. 

The stadium also hosts carboot sales on Sundays and Bank Holiday Mondays from March until the end of September opening at 6.00am and costing £9.00 to sell and 50p a person entry.

References

Stock car racing venues
Speedway venues in England
Sports venues in Ipswich